Clyde Joseph Powers (born August 19, 1951) is a former American football safety in the National Football League. He was drafted by the New York Giants in the fifth round of the 1974 NFL Draft. He played college football at Oklahoma.

Powers also played for the Kansas City Chiefs.

1951 births
Living people
People from Pascagoula, Mississippi
Players of American football from Mississippi
American football safeties
Oklahoma Sooners football players
New York Giants players
Kansas City Chiefs players